Barton Arvin Shirley  (born January 4, 1940) is a former Major League Baseball infielder. He played in 75 games in four seasons (1964, 1966–1968) for the Los Angeles Dodgers and New York Mets. He also played in Japan for two seasons with the Chunichi Dragons in 1971–1972.

From 1973–1975 he managed in Class-A minor leagues for the Dodgers.

External links
, or Pelota Binaria (Venezuelan Winter League)

1940 births
Living people
American expatriate baseball players in Japan
Arizona Instructional League Dodgers players
Atlanta Crackers players
Baseball players from Texas
Cardenales de Lara players
American expatriate baseball players in Venezuela
Chunichi Dragons players
Los Angeles Dodgers players
Major League Baseball infielders
Minor league baseball managers
New York Mets players
Nippon Professional Baseball coaches
Nippon Professional Baseball infielders
Omaha Dodgers players
Spokane Indians players
Sportspeople from Corpus Christi, Texas
Texas Longhorns baseball players